KRI Usman Harun (359) is a Bung Tomo-class corvette in service with the Indonesian Navy. She was originally built for the Royal Brunei Navy and launched as KDB Bendahara Sakam in 2001.

Class background 
The Bung Tomo-class corvettes are three vessels built by BAE Systems Marine (now BAE Systems Maritime – Naval Ships). The contract was awarded to GEC-Marconi in 1995 and the ships, a variant of the F2000 design, were launched in January 2001, June 2001 and June 2002 at the then BAE Systems Marine yard at Scotstoun, Glasgow. The customer refused to accept the vessels and the contract dispute became the subject of arbitration. When the dispute was settled in favour of BAE Systems, the vessels were handed over to Royal Brunei Technical Services in June 2007.

In 2007, Brunei contracted the German Lürssen shipyard to find a new customer for the three ships.

The ships were originally armed with MBDA Exocet Block II anti-ship missiles and MBDA Seawolf air-defence missiles. The main gun is an OTO Melara 76 mm; the ship also carries two torpedo tubes, two 30 mm remote weapon stations and has a landing spot for a helicopter. As of 2018, the MBDA Seawolf missile was out of service there was plans to replace it with the VL Mica.

Construction and career 
The ship was launched as KDB Bendahara Sakam on 23 June 2001, but never commissioned into the Royal Brunei Navy. She was subsequently sold and commissioned into the Indonesian Navy as KRI Usman Harun on 18 July 2014. Her hull number 29 was changed to 359. 

The Singapore government protested against the naming of the ship, with its foreign minister K. Shanmugam commenting that its namesakes had instigated the 1965 MacDonald House bombing during the Indonesia-Malaysia confrontation, resulting in three deaths and the commandos being captured and executed thereafter. The ship was subsequently banned from entering Singapore ports and sea bases, with the Singapore Armed Forces declining to partake in exercises involving the ship.

Deployments 
In early January 2015, KRI Usman Harun was deployed to search for the black boxes as the ship is equipped with the Thales Underwater Systems TMS 4130C1 hull-mounted sonar.

On 11 January 2020, KRI Usman Harun was shadowed by China Coast Guard ships 5202 and 5203 off the Natuna Regency.

References 

Royal Brunei Navy
2001 ships
Ships of Brunei
Bung Tomo-class corvettes